Leonard Stern may refer to:

Leonard B. Stern (1923–2011), American television producer, director and writer
Leonard N. Stern (born 1938), American business executive
Leonard J. Stern, Ohio Supreme Court judge

See also
Leo Stern (1862–1904), English-German cellist
Leo Stern (historian) (1901–1982) Austrian-German political activist, historian and university rector
Stern (surname)